Felisha Leffler is an American politician. She has served in the Vermont House of Representatives since 2019.

References

Living people
Sweet Briar College alumni
21st-century American politicians
Republican Party members of the Vermont House of Representatives
Year of birth missing (living people)
Women state legislators in Vermont
21st-century American women politicians